Francisco Bravo Medical Magnet High School is a magnet public high school in the Los Angeles Unified School District with a focus on serving students who plan to study in the healthcare field. It is located near the LAC+USC Medical Center, in the Lincoln Heights neighborhood of Los Angeles, California, United States.

As of the 2014-15 school year, the school had an enrollment of 1,841 students and 70.3 classroom teachers (on an FTE basis), for a student–teacher ratio of 26.2:1. There were 1,583 students (86.0% of enrollment) eligible for free lunch and 69 (3.7% of students) eligible for reduced-cost lunch.

Awards and recognition
During the 2006-2007 school year, Francisco Bravo Medical Magnet High School was recognized with the Blue Ribbon School Award of Excellence by the United States Department of Education, the highest award an American school can receive.

In their annual list of the top 1,300 high schools in the United States, Newsweek ranked Francisco Bravo Medical Magnet High School as 352nd in 2008 and 291st in 2007. In 2007, U.S. News & World Report named it one of its top 100 public high schools.

History
Originally, a magnet center was established at nearby Lincoln High School before moving to Wilson High School from 1985 until 1989. Bravo Medical Magnet is named after Francisco Bravo M.D., a well-known physician who practiced in East Los Angeles, established his own clinic, and founded a scholarship fund for needy high school students interested in the health science professions. Groundbreaking on Francisco Bravo Medical Magnet High School started in 1987 and construction was completed in 1990. Dr. Rosa Maria Hernández, who was instrumental in the school's construction, served as principal from the school's opening until 2003 when she became the District F Coordinator. She was then succeeded by Maria Torres-Flores.

Location
Bravo is located in a commercial and residential section of Eastside Los Angeles, about 8 minutes from the Los Angeles Civic Center.

Bravo is located adjacent to the LAC+USC Medical Center Complex, which includes the Keck School of Medicine of USC, USC School of Pharmacy, Los Angeles County+USC Medical Center, Norris Cancer Hospital, and the USC University Hospital.

The school's proximity to USC has enabled partnerships, Bravo was adopted by the Los Angeles County+USC Medical Center in September 1981, shortly after the school opened as a small magnet center on the Lincoln High School campus. The school has agreements with USC Medical Center as well as California State University, Los Angeles (Cal State LA) in promoting health-related activities and projects.

Magnet Program
Bravo’s medical magnet program was originally part of the school integration program to be accessible to all students in the Los Angeles Unified School District, so the school community has wide geographical boundaries. Thirty buses deliver 85% of Bravo’s 1,726 students, some of whom travel up to an hour to school and are drawn from 32 middle schools. Students apply through the District’s “Choices” program and are selected by the district’s lottery.

Student Body
Bravo serves around 1,847 students in grades nine through twelve, with a student-teacher ratio of 25:1. Full-time teachers 75. Approximately 40% of the students attending Bravo are from the surrounding community in what now comprises LAUSD Local District East. The remaining 60% commute from other areas of the Los Angeles Unified School District.

Demographics

Bravo's demographics currently indicate 80% Hispanic students, 13.1% Asian/Filipino/Pacific Islander, 2% African-American, and 0.1% American Indian/Alaskan Native. Over the past six years, Bravo has maintained a steady total enrollment and has seen a general decline in all ethnic populations except the Hispanic group which has increased 15% (with a corresponding drop in other populations).

Title I Students
For 2006-07, Bravo has approximately 82% (1,415 students) of all students that are socioeconomically disadvantaged. About 72% of the students’ home language is not English. Bravo High School has a school-wide Title I program and is one of the very few Title I High Schools that have surpassed the 800 API level.

Academics

us news 2021 Rankings
4 in Los Angeles Unified School District high Schools
16 in Los Angeles metropolitan area High Schools
44 in California High Schools
82 in Magnet High Schools
335 in National Rankings

us news 2020 Rankings
6 in Los Angeles Unified School District high Schools
17 in Los Angeles metropolitan area High Schools
46 in California High Schools
83 in Magnet High Schools
388 in National Rankings

us news 2019 Rankings
15 in Los Angeles metropolitan area High Schools
47 in California High Schools
79 in Magnet High Schools
382 in National Rankings

Academic Performance Index (API)
The Academic Performance Index—API for High Schools in the LAUSD District 5 and local small public charter high schools in the East Los Angeles region.

Bravo API Scores
The Bravo Medical Magnet High School API scores:
2012 API: 842
2011 API: 832
2010 API: 820
2009 API: 815
2008 API: 818
2007 API: 807
2006 API: 807
2005 API: 819
2004 API: 788
2003 API: 766
2002 API: 737
2001 API: 733
2000 API: 732
1999 API: 715

Notable alumni 
 David Ryu - Former member of Los Angeles City Council, 2015-2020
 Angela Sarafyan - Actress

See also

References

External links
 Official Bravo Medical Magnet High School website

High schools in Los Angeles
Los Angeles Unified School District schools
Magnet schools in California
Public high schools in California
Boyle Heights, Los Angeles
Educational institutions established in 1990
1990 establishments in California